The Grand Court Order of Calanthe is a fraternal benefit society for African American women. It was established in Louisiana in 1883 as an auxiliary to the Knights of Pythias. Calanthe was the wife of Pythias in the Greek legend Damon and Pythias.

The Texas order is commemorated with a historical marker. It provided life insurance. The University of Texas San Antonio has a photograph of a parade of members. A court was established in Florida in 1887.

An office building for the group was built at 2411 Dowling Street in Texas. Ritual books were published. The organization has been sued over benefits.

Knights of Pythias and Court of Calanthe members were photographed in front of a girls home in Kansas City, Missouri.

In 2018, the Texas court became the Calanthe Historical Society.

Members
Carrie A. Tuggle
Mame Stewart Josenberger
Vivian Osborne Marsh
Fannie Emanuel

References

Fraternal orders
1883 establishments in Louisiana
Organizations established in 1883
African-American women's organizations